Walter George Mitchell,  (May 30, 1877 – April 3, 1935) was a Canadian lawyer and politician.

Early life 
Born in Danby, Quebec, the son of William Mitchell, a Canadian senator, and Dora Godard, Mitchell was educated at the Montreal High School, Bishop's College, and McGill University where he received a Bachelor of Civil Law degree in 1901 and was a charter member of The Kappa Alpha Society.

Career 
After being called to the Quebec Bar in 1901, he practiced law with the law firm of Greenshields, Greenshields & Heneker. He soon was part of the firm Laflamme, Mitchell and Callaghan and was created a King's Counsel in 1912.

He was acclaimed to the Legislative Assembly of Quebec for the electoral district of Richmond in a 1914 by-election called after the death of Peter Samuel George Mackenzie. A Liberal, he was re-elected by acclamation in 1916 and in 1919. He was Treasurer of the Province of Quebec from 1914 to 1921 in the cabinet of Lomer Gouin and Louis-Alexandre Taschereau.

From 1918 to 1921, he was Minister of Municipal Affairs. He resigned in 1921 and was elected to the House of Commons of Canada for the electoral district of St. Antoine. A Liberal, he resigned in May 1924. He ran again in the 1930 election for the electoral district of Richmond—Wolfe but was defeated.

References

See also 
List of Bishop's College School alumni

1877 births
1935 deaths
High School of Montreal alumni
Liberal Party of Canada MPs
Members of the House of Commons of Canada from Quebec
Lawyers in Quebec
Quebec Liberal Party MNAs
Bishop's College School alumni
Canadian King's Counsel
Anglophone Quebec people
Canadian people of Irish descent
McGill University Faculty of Law alumni